Jinks may refer to:

Jinx, a type of curse placed on a person, or a person afflicted with a similar curse, and also a  slang term used when two people say the same thing at the same time
Jinks (rapper), a Danish rapper, also known as Ankerstjerne
Jinks, Kentucky
Jinks Island, an island in the Biscoe Islands
Jinks (surname), for people with this name

Others
Captain Jinks of the Horse Marines, a 1975 opera by Jack Beeson 
Jinks, an animated orange cat on Pixie and Dixie and Mr. Jinks, a regular segment of the television series The Huckleberry Hound Show
 Steve Jinks, a character in the television series Warehouse 13.

See also
Jinx
Jinx (disambiguation)